JAC Liner Inc. is one of the largest bus companies in the Philippines serving the riding public en route to Southern Luzon provinces which includes key destinations in the provinces of Laguna, Batangas, Quezon and Marinduque.

History
JAC (Jaime A. Chua) Liner, owned by the Chua Family, began operating in April 1987 as a sole proprietorship operating two second hand buses along the Alabang - Fairview route. The owner's family backyard lot functioned as the company's repair garage and head office.

In 1988, JAC Liner acquired eight additional second-hand buses from other bus operators. These were rehabilitated and made operational. A year after, they were assisted by the Bus Installment Purchase Program (BIPP), a program that would allow them to purchase buses on installment basis which allowed them to purchase 26 new buses and was granted to have additional franchises along EDSA.

In March 1992, they were formally incorporated as JAC Liner Inc. Two years later, they moved their operations to the Southern Tagalog region, where it established itself as one of the largest bus companies in the country.

In 2004, the founders decided to go on semi-retirement and passed on the day-to-day management of the company to their children while retaining long-term policy-making functions of the corporation. In December of that same year, JAC Liner formed their first subsidiary, Lucena Lines, Inc., with a fleet of around 60 buses.

In 2010, JAC Liner bought the Tarlac City-based company Dionisio R. De Leon Express and established Pangasinan Solid North Transit, Inc. From 30 or so bus units, Pangasinan Solid North expanded their fleet size up to around 150 bus units. In 2011, JAC Liner became the first bus company in the country to offer free WiFi on board through a partnership with the Philippine Long Distance Telephone Company.

In March 2014,  JAC Liner took over the Santa Cruz line of Green Star Express. Months later, JAC Liner acquired the whole franchise of Greenstar and their remaining buses were transferred to LLI Bus Company, but they retained some units under the Green Star Express Inc. name.

In 2015, JAC Liner took over the Dagupan Bus Company Inc. and the provincial operations of Fermina Express, which had a total of 300 buses combined. The company also debuted a new city bus subsidiary, Metro Manila Bus Co., with routes from Baclaran to Fairview via EDSA and Quezon Avenue.

In 2021, JAC Liner acquired JAM Liner Inc. and JAM Transit to expand their route network.

Subsidiaries

Dagupan Bus
EMC LBS Bus Line (operated by Pangasinan Solid North Transit)
Lucena Lines
Metro Manila Bus Company
Pangasinan Solid North Transit, Inc. 
JAM Liner
 CHER Transport

Discontinued subsidiaries
These are their discontinued subsidiaries / bus company names which once they bought before:
De Leon Express (from De Leon Express,now under Pangasinan Solid North Transit Inc.)
Green Star (now  under Lucena Lines Inc. and now rebranded under South City Express Inc.)
Fermina Express [Provincial Operations] (renamed and now under Pangasinan Solid North Transit Inc.)
Laguna Express Inc. (renamed and now under Lucena Lines Inc.)

Fleet

JAC Liner Inc. runs ordinary and air conditioned bus units. Recently, the company has started to offer deluxe trips as well. Majority of their buses are made from Yutong.
 Del Monte Monte Works DM 12 (operated by Dagupan Bus Company Inc)
 MAN 16.290 AMC Tourist Star (former LionStar body)

 Santarosa Motorworks Daewoo BV115 "Cityliner" (operated by Dagupan Bus Company Inc)
 Hino RK1J series, body built by Hino Motors Philippines Corporation
 Modified locally built buses by ABTii
 Yutong ZK6100H
 Yutong ZK6107HA
 Yutong ZK6119HA
 Yutong ZK6119H2
 Yutong ZK6122HD9
 King Long XMQ6118JB
 Wuzhoulong FDG6110B
 Wuzhoulong FDG6110EC3
 Golden Dragon XML6103

Former bus units:
 Del Monte Motor Works Euro Bus (MAN 16.290 chassis)
 Del Monte Motor Works Euro Bus (UD Nissan Diesel chassis)
 Nissan Diesel Philippines Corporation - Euro Trans RB46SR
 Nissan Diesel Philippines Corporation - Euro Trans  JA430SAN
 Santarosa Motorworks - Exfoh (UD Nissan Diesel RB46S chassis)
Mercedes-Benz fleets bodied by major locally built manufacturers

Bus terminals

Metro Manila
They have three bus terminals in Metro Manila, to wit:
Araneta City Bus Port, Cubao, Quezon City
EDSA cor. Mapagmahal St., Brgy. Kamias, Quezon City
Buendia Avenue, Pasay

Provincial 
These are their major hubs along the provinces, to wit:
Brgy. Poblacion, Biñan, Laguna
Balibago Complex, Brgy. Balibago, Santa Rosa, Laguna
SM Calamba Transport Terminal, National Highway, Calamba, Laguna
Lucena Grand Terminal, Brgy. Ilayang Dupay, Lucena, Quezon

Destinations

Their routes as of 2016 with exclusion to their services within Metro Manila:

Metro Manila
 Alabang, Muntinlupa
 Araneta City Bus Port, Cubao, Quezon City
 Ayala Center, Makati
 Buendia, Pasay
 Kamias, Quezon City
 Parañaque Integrated Terminal Exchange, Parañaque

Provincial Destinations
 Balibago, Santa Rosa City, Laguna
 Southwoods Mall, Biñan, Laguna 
 Santa Rosa Integrated Terminal in front of SM City Santa Rosa, Laguna
 Pacita, San Pedro, Laguna
 Calamba, Laguna
 Santa Cruz, Laguna 
 San Pablo City, Laguna 
 Lucena City, Quezon
 Mauban, Quezon
 Santa Cruz, Marinduque

Under Lucena Lines

With the under management of JAC Liner Lucena Lines uses the terminals and facilities of JAC Liner including their main terminal in Buendia.

Metro Manila
Buendia, Pasay
Alabang, Muntinlupa
Araneta City Bus Port, Cubao, Quezon City
Kamias, Quezon City
 Parañaque Integrated Terminal Exchange, Parañaque
Provincial Destinations
Lucena City, Quezon
Mauban, Quezon
Santa Cruz, Laguna
Biñan, Laguna
San Pedro, Laguna

Under Solid North
With the under management of JAC Liner, Solid North uses the facilities of JAC Liner, including their main terminal in Cubao

Metro Manila
Kamias, Quezon City
Avenida Santa Cruz, Manila
Araneta City Bus Port, Cubao, Quezon City
Parañaque Integrated Terminal Exchange, Parañaque
Provincial Destinations
Baguio
Mabalacat, Pampanga (Dau Bus Terminal)
San Fernando, Pampanga
Camiling, Tarlac
Tarlac City
Dagupan
Bayambang, Pangasinan
Malasiqui, Pangasinan
Rosales, Pangasinan
San Carlos, Pangasinan
Alcala, Pangasinan
Villasis, Pangasinan
Santa Barbara, Pangasinan
Cuyapo, Nueva Ecija
Cabanatuan
San Jose, Nueva Ecija
Inter-Provincial Destinations
Baguio - Cabanatuan (via Tarlac & Guimba/Cuyapo)
Baguio - Dagupan (via Agoo)
Baguio - Bayambang (via SM Carmen)
Dagupan - San Fernando, Pampanga (via Tarlac & Angeles)
Dagupan - Dau (via Tarlac)
Premium Point to Point
PITX/NAIA Terminal 3 - Baguio

Under Dagupan Bus

Under management of JAC Liner, Dagupan Bus uses the facilities of JAC Liner, including their main terminal in Cubao.

Metro Manila
Kamias, Quezon City
Araneta City Bus Port, Cubao, Quezon City
Provincial Destinations
Mabalacat City, Pampanga (Dau Bus Terminal)
Camiling, Tarlac
Tarlac City, Tarlac
San Manuel, Tarlac
Capas, Tarlac
Gerona, Tarlac
Moncada, Tarlac
Paniqui, Tarlac
San Manuel, Tarlac
Agno, Pangasinan
Alaminos, Pangasinan
Bolinao, Pangasinan
Dagupan via Manaoag
Lingayen, Pangasinan
Manaoag, Pangasinan
Mangatarem, Pangasinan
Inter-Provincial Destinations
Dagupan - Baguio

Former destinations
JAC Liner once served Manila to Batangas City route. However, Yanson Group of Bus Companies came with an agreement with JAC Liner to open their routes from Batangas to Manila and will have their rights to use their bus hubs in Cubao and Buendia. Through this, the said route is now being served by Yanson's subsidiary, Ceres Transport and Gold Star Bus Transport Inc.

They also once served the Manila - Pacita, San Pedro, Laguna, which is now inactive.

See also
 List of bus companies of the Philippines
 Dagupan Bus Co, Inc.
 Fermina Express
 JAM Liner
 Lucena Lines
 Philtranco
 Saulog Transit Inc.

References

Bus companies of the Philippines
Companies based in Quezon City
1987 establishments in the Philippines